Ron O'Brien is an American diving coach and author. He was the head Ohio State University coach from 1963-78. He coached Greg Louganis.

Athletic career
O’Brien began his athletic career as a diver at the YMCA of Pittsburgh, Pennsylvania. Once in college at Ohio State University, he earned six varsity letters in gymnastics and diving. In diving he went on to become NCAA national champion on 1 meter springboard (1959) and AAU national champion on 3 meter springboard (1961). After his college career, he worked as an performer in a professional water stunt show alongside fellow dive coach Dick Kimball. In 1960, O'Brien placed third in the US diving Olympic trials, missing the top two qualification slots.

Coaching career
After his time as an athlete ended, O'Brien began coaching. Over the years, he has coached divers of all skill levels resulting in over 350 medals in elite dive meets all over the world. He also has been a USA Olympic coach at 8 Olympic Games from 1968 to 1996. In total, the Olympians coached by O’Brien have won five gold, three silver, and four bronze medals. O'Brien holds the record for producing at least one national champion in the most consecutive years, with a 23-year streak from 1973 to 1995. In 1982, O'Brien's California divers took all four of the available gold medals at the world championships. O'Brien created a website, diverstocollege.com, which purports to help high school divers get recruited.

Honors and awards
O'Brien has been the recipient of the "Outstanding Senior US Diving Coach Award" 14 times.

He is the only aquatic coach in the US Olympic Hall of Fame. He has also entered the Halls of Fame for the Ohio State Athletics and The International Swimming and Pennsylvania Sports Halls of Fame. Because of his history as both an athlete and coach at Ohio State, the school’s diving well was named in his honor.

Publications

Diving My Way
Diving My Way is an instructional diving video which breaks down the mechanics of diving using slow motion and picture-by-picture effects. The video is broken down into the categories: Body Alignment, Board Work, Basic Dives, Entries, Somersaulting, Twisting, and Platform Diving.

Ron O'Brien's Diving for Gold
Diving for Gold breaks down the mechanics of each dive on 1 meter, 3 meter, and platform. The book also explains "O'Brien's winning formula for constructing the forward approach." Along with discussing the basic mechanics of diving, the book talks about O'Brien's philosophy for how divers should mentally approach diving.

Retirement
After retiring from coaching in 1996, O'Brien became the national technical director for USA Diving. He currently lives in Islamorada, Florida with his wife.

See also
 List of members of the International Swimming Hall of Fame

References

External links 
 Ron O'Brien at the U.S. Olympic & Paralympic Hall of Fame

American Olympic coaches
American diving coaches
Ohio State Buckeyes men's gymnasts
Living people
Year of birth missing (living people)
Ohio State Buckeyes men's divers